Bryan House and Office is a historic home and office building located at New Bern, Craven County, North Carolina.  It was built between 1804 and 1806 on the grounds of the original Tryon Palace.  It is a -story, three bay, side-hall plan Federal style brick dwelling. The house was modernized and a rear wing added in 1840.  East of the home is a one-story, frame office building on a brick foundation.  It was the home of Congressman John Heritage Bryan (1798–1870).

It was listed on the National Register of Historic Places in 1972.

References

External links

Historic American Buildings Survey in North Carolina
Houses on the National Register of Historic Places in North Carolina
Federal architecture in North Carolina
Houses completed in 1806
Houses in New Bern, North Carolina
National Register of Historic Places in Craven County, North Carolina